The 12th Seiyu Awards was held on March 3, 2018 at the JOQR Media Plus Hall in Minato, Tokyo. The winners of the Merit Awards, the Kei Tomiyama Award and the Kazue Takahashi Award were announced on February 16, 2018. The rest of the winners were announced on the ceremony day.

References

12th Seiyu Awards
2018 film awards
2017 television awards
March 2018 events in Japan
2018 in Japanese cinema
2018 in Japanese television